Karnataka State Film Award for Best Actor is a state film award of the Indian state of Karnataka  given during the annual Karnataka State Film Awards. The award honours Kannada Language films.

Superlatives

Recipients

The first recipient was Rajkumar who was honored in 1967 for his performance in Bangaarada Hoovu. As of 2019 he was the most honored actor with nine awards. Vishnuvardhan was honored in seven occasions. Two actors Anant Nag, Shiva Rajkumar have been honored four times, while Lokesh honored three times and two actors Ramesh Aravind, Puneeth Rajkumar have won the award two times. The award was tied in 1998 between Vishnuvardhan and Ramesh Aravind. Shiva Rajkumar, Raghavendra Rajkumar and Puneeth Rajkumar are the siblings bagged this award.  The most recent recipient is Raghavendra Rajkumar who is honored in 2018 for his performance in the film Ammana Mane.

The following is a complete list of award winners and the name of the films for which they won.

Key

See also
 Cinema of Karnataka
 List of Kannada-language films

References

Karnataka State Film Awards
Kannada-language films